Ocala is a city in and the county seat of Marion County within the northern region of Florida, United States. As of the 2020 United States Census, the city's population was 63,591, making it the 54th most populated city in Florida.

Home to over 400 thoroughbred farms and training centers, Ocala was officially named the Horse Capital of the World in 2007. Notable attractions include the Ocala National Forest, Silver Springs State Park, Rainbow Springs State Park, the College of Central Florida, and the World Equestrian Center.

Ocala is the principal city of the Ocala, Florida Metropolitan Statistical Area, which had an estimated 2017 population of 354,353.

History
Ocala is located near what is thought to have been the site of Ocale or Ocali, a major Timucua village and chiefdom recorded in the 16th century. The modern city takes its name from the historical village, the name of which is believed to mean "Big Hammock" in the Timucua language. The Spaniard Hernando de Soto's expedition recorded Ocale in 1539 during his exploration through what is today the southeastern United States. Ocale is not mentioned in later Spanish accounts; it appears to have been abandoned in the wake of de Soto's attack. 

In the late eighteenth and early nineteenth centuries, Creek people and other Native Americans, and free and fugitive African Americans sought refuge in Florida. The Seminole people formed. After foreign colonial rule shifted between Spain and Great Britain and back again, in 1821 the United States acquired the territory of Florida. After warfare to the north, in 1827 the U.S. Army built Fort King near the present site of Ocala as a buffer between the Seminole, who had long occupied the area, and white settlers moving into the region. The fort was an important base during the Second Seminole War and later served in 1844 as the first courthouse for Marion County. 

The modern city of Ocala, which was established in 1849, developed around the fort site. Greater Ocala is known as the "Kingdom of the Sun". Plantations and other agricultural development dependent on slave labor were prevalent in the region. Ocala was an important center of citrus production until the Great Freeze of 1894–1895. 
During the Reconstruction era Ocala was represented by several African Americans in the Florida House of Representatives and on the local level.

Rail service reached Ocala in June 1881, encouraging economic development with greater access to markets for produce. Two years later, much of the Ocala downtown area was destroyed by fire on Thanksgiving Day, 1883. The city encouraged rebuilding with brick, granite and steel rather than lumber. By 1888, Ocala was known statewide as "The Brick City". 

In December 1890, the Farmers' Alliance and Industrial Union, a forerunner of the Populist Party, held its national convention in Ocala. At the convention, the Alliance adopted a platform that would become known as the "Ocala Demands". This platform included abolition of national banks, promoting low-interest government loans, free and unlimited coinage of silver, reclamation of excess railroad lands by the government, a graduated income tax, and direct election of United States senators. Most of the "Ocala Demands" were to become part of the Populist Party platform.

Late 20th-century establishment as horse capital
The first thoroughbred horse farm in Florida was developed in Marion County in 1943 by Carl G. Rose. Other farms were developed, making Ocala the center of a horse-breeding area. Local horses have won individual races of the Triple Crown series; in 1978, Affirmed, who was bred and trained in Marion County, won all three races, boosting interest in the industry there.

Ocala is one of only five cities (four in the US and one in France) permitted under Chamber of Commerce guidelines to use the title, "Horse Capital of the World", based on annual revenue produced by the horse industry. 44,000 jobs are sustained by breeding, training, and related support of the equine industry, which generates over $2.2 billion in annual revenue. Postime Farms and Ocala serve as host to one of the largest horse shows in the country: H.I.T.S or "Horses in the Sun", a Dressage/Jumper event lasting about two months. It generates some 6 to 7 million dollars for the local Marion County economy each year. The show features classes for over 100 different breeds, including Tennessee Walker, Paso Fino, Morgan horse, Saddlebred, Draft horse and the American Quarter Horse. Other equine events in the area include mounted shooting by the Florida Outlaws, as well as endurance rides, barrel races, extreme cowboy events, jumper shows, trick shows, parades, draft pulls, rodeo events and more.

Growth

In the last decades of the twentieth century, the greater Ocala area had one of the highest growth rates in the country for a city its size. The population of Marion County in 2000 was more than 250,000, up from under 100,000 in 1975.

Ocala Historic District
Many historic homes are preserved in Ocala's large residential Historic District, designated in 1984. East Fort King Street features many excellent examples of Victorian architecture. Ocala structures listed on the National Register of Historic Places include the Coca-Cola Building, the E. C. Smith House, East Hall, the Marion Hotel, Mount Zion A.M.E. Church, the Ritz Historic Inn, and Union Train Station.

The original Fort King site was designated as a National Historic Landmark in 2004.

Geography

The surrounding farms are famous for their thoroughbred horses, in terrain similar to Kentucky bluegrass. Ocala is also known for nearby Silver Springs, site of one of the largest artesian spring formations in the world and Silver Springs Nature Theme Park, one of the earliest tourist attractions in Florida.

Marion County is also home to the Ocala National Forest which was established in 1908 and is now the second largest national forest in the state. The Florida Trail, also known as the Florida National Scenic Trail, cuts through Ocala National Forest. Silver Springs State Park was formed as Silver River State Park in 1987, out of land the state purchased around the Silver Springs attraction to spare it from development. The state took over Silver Springs itself in 1993 and incorporated it into the park in 2013.

Climate
Ocala has a humid subtropical climate (Cfa), with hot, humid summers and mild winters.

Demographics

Ocala first appeared in the 1850 U.S. Census, with a total recorded population of 243. Ocala did not report separately in 1860.

As of the 2010 through 2014 census, Ocala was 63.3% non Hispanic white, 20.4% African American, 11.7% Hispanic or Latino, 2.6% Asian, 2% all other. As of the census of 2000, there were 45,943 people, 18,646 households, and 11,280 families residing in the city. The racial makeup of the city was 72.9% White, 22.1% African American, 0.4% Native American, 1.2% Asian, <0.1% Pacific Islander, 1.8% from other races, and 1.6% from two or more races. Hispanic or Latino of any race were 5.7% of the population.

There were 18,646 households. 40.9% were married couples living together, 15.9% had a female householder with no husband present, and 39.5% were non-families. 33.0% of all households were made up of individuals, and 15.0% had someone living alone who was 65 years of age or older. The average household size was 2.29 and the average family size was 2.91.

In the city the population was spread out, with 23.2% under the age of 18, 9.3% from 18 to 24, 26.2% from 25 to 44, 20.9% from 45 to 64, and 20.4% who were 65 years of age or older. The median age was 39 years. For every 100 females, there were 89.7 males. For every 100 females age 18 and over, there were 85.5 males.

Economy
The median income for a household in the city was $30,888, and the median income for a family was $38,190. Males had a median income of $29,739 versus $24,367 for females. The per capita income for the city was $18,021. About 13.2% of families and 18.1% of the population were below the poverty line, including 28.6% of those under age 18 and 9.8% of those age 65 or over.

Ocala is the headquarters of Emergency One, a worldwide designer and manufacturer of fire rescue vehicles.

Top employers
According to Ocala's 2019 Comprehensive Annual Financial Report, the top employers in the city are:

Government and politics
Ocala is governed by a five-member board of councillors and a mayor, all of which are elected on a nonpartisan basis. It has a council-manager form of government, relying on a manager hired by the city. The mayor sets policy but has few powers other than vetoing legislation passed by the council and tending to some duties involving the police department. The current mayor is Kent Guinn. The city manager handles most administrative and financial matters.

A number of county offices are housed at the McPherson Governmental Complex.

As of 2020, Republicans outnumber Democrats in Marion County, 112,000 to 80,000. In the 2008 presidential election, John McCain carried both the city and the county, the latter by a landslide, although Florida as a whole voted for Democrat Barack Obama by a narrow margin.

Education
The public schools in Ocala are run by the Marion County School Board. There are 30 elementary, ten middle and ten public high schools in Marion County, which include the following schools in Ocala:
 Elementary schools

Anthony Elementary School
College Park Elementary School
Dr. N. H. Jones Elementary School
Eighth Street Elementary School
Evergreen Elementary School (closed in May 2021)
Greenway Elementary School
Ward-Highlands Elementary School
Wyomina Park Elementary School
Emerald Shores Elementary School
Fessenden Elementary School
Fort McCoy School (K–8)
Hammett Bowen Jr. Elementary School
Madison Street Academy of Visual and Performing Arts (Magnet)
Maplewood Elementary School
Marion Oaks Elementary School
Oakcrest Elementary School
Ocala Springs Elementary School
Reddick-Collier Elementary School
Saddlewood Elementary School
Shady Hill Elementary School
South Ocala Elementary School
Sparr Elementary School
Sunrise Elementary School
 
 Middle schools

Fort King
Howard
Liberty Middle School
Horizon Academy at Marion Oaks (5–8)
Osceola Middle School
North Marion Middle School

 High schools

Forest High School
Marion Technical Institute
Vanguard High School
West Port High School
Francis Marion Military Academy (now closed)
North Marion High School
Lake Weir High School

 Private schools

Ambleside School Of Ocala grades K–8
Blessed Trinity School grades K–9
Children's Palace East & Academy grades K–2
The Cornerstone School grades PK–8
Crossroads Academy grades 3–12
Grace Academy Grades K–2
Grace Christian School grades PK–8
Meadowbrook Academy grades K–12
Montessori Preparatory School grades K–5
New Generation School grades K–12
Ocala Christian Academy grades PK–12
Ocean's High School grades PK–12
Promiseland Academy grades K–7
First Assembly Christian School grades K–12
The Reading Clinic grades 2–6
Redeemer Christian School grades K3–12
The Rock Academy grades PK–9
The School of the Kingdom grades 1–12
Shiloh SDA Church School
Belleview Christian Academy grades PK–12
St John Lutheran School grades PK–12
Trinity Catholic grades 9–12

Colleges and universities
Ocala is home to the College of Central Florida, a member of the Florida College System, accredited by the Southern Association of Colleges and Schools Commission on Colleges. CF offers  bachelor's degrees in Business and Organizational Management, Early Childhood Education, and Nursing, as well as associate degrees and certificates. The college offers specialty programs in equine studies, agribusiness, and logistics and supply chain management.  It also has one of 21 campuses of Rasmussen College, a Higher Learning Commission regionally accredited post secondary institution. Webster University offers on-site, regionally accredited graduate degree programs in business and counseling at their Ocala Metropolitan Campus.

Libraries
Three of the eight libraries in the Marion County Public Library System are located in Ocala. Those three libraries are:
 Freedom Public Library
 Marion Oaks Public Library
 Ocala Public Library – Headquarters for the Marion County Public Library System.

Sister cities

Ocala has two sister cities:
  Newbridge, County Kildare, in Ireland (2008)
  Pisa and San Rossore in Italy  (2004)

Transportation

Major roads

Several major highways pass through Ocala, including Interstate 75, U.S. Highway 27, U.S. Route 301, and U.S. Highway 441. Ocala was on the western leg of the historic Dixie Highway.

  Interstate 75 runs north and south across the western edge of the city, with interchanges at SR 200 (exit 350), SR 40 (exit 352), and US 27 (exit 354).
  U.S. Route 27 runs north and south throughout Ocala. It is multiplexed with US 301 and 441 until it reaches SR 492(Northwest 10th Street), then makes a sharp turn onto NW 10th Street then curves northwest through Williston, Perry, Tallahassee, and beyond.
  U.S. Route 301 is the main local north and south road through Ocala. It is multiplexed with US 27 until it reaches Northwest 10th Street, and with US 441 throughout the city.
  U.S. Route 441 is the main local north and south road through Ocala. It is multiplexed with US 27 until it reaches Northwest 10th Street, and with US 301 throughout the city.
  State Road 492 runs east and west through the northern part of the city from the northern terminus of the US 27 multiplex with US 301–441 to SR 40 just southwest of the Silver Springs city limit.
  State Road 40 runs east and west through Ocala. It spans from Rainbow Lakes Estates through Ocala National Forest to Ormond Beach in Volusia County, although a bi-county extension exists, spanning from Yankeetown in Levy County to Dunnellon, south of the western terminus of SR 40.
  State Road 464 runs east and west from SR 200 through the southeastern part of the city. Beyond the city limits, it continues southeast towards State Road 35, and continues as County Road 464.
  State Road 200 runs northeast and southwest from Hernando in Citrus County through US 27-301-441 where it becomes a "hidden state road" along US 301 until it reaches Callahan, and is multiplexed with SR A1A into Fernandina Beach.

Other transportation
Ocala International Airport provides general aviation services to the community. Ocala Suntran provides bus service throughout select parts of the city. One of the major hubs for Suntran is the former Ocala Union Station, which served Amtrak trains until November 2004. Amtrak serves Ocala by bus connection to Jacksonville and Lakeland.
Ocala is also served by Greyhound Bus Lines.  Marion Transit is the complementary ADA paratransit service for SunTran the fixed route in the City of Ocala.  Marion Transit was established in 1976 and operates paratransit buses providing public transportation throughout Marion County for the Transportation Disadvantaged population.

Notable people

 Antonio Allen, NFL player
 Arthur I. Appleton, businessman, racehorse owner
 Elizabeth Ashley, actress
 Tony Beckham, NFL cornerback
 Thelma Berlack Boozer, journalist, publicist
 Brittany Bowe, Olympic speed skater
 Emery N. Brown, Anesthesiologist and Neuroscientist
 Farris Bryant, former Governor
 Daunte Culpepper, NFL quarterback
 James Dean, first African-American judge in Florida
 Caydee Denney, figure skater
 Haven Denney, figure skater
 Drayton Florence, NFL cornerback
 Dory Funk Jr., professional wrestler
 Don Garlits, professional drag racer
 Santana Garrett, professional wrestler
 Joey Gilmore, blues musician
 Troy Glaus, former Major League Baseball player
 Mitch Harris, Major League Baseball pitcher
 Josh Hart (racer), professional drag racer
 Erin Jackson, Olympic gold medalist speed skater
 Lee James, Olympic weightlifter 1976 silver medalist
 Val James, professional ice hockey player
 Eddie Johnson, NBA basketball player
 Frank Johnson, NBA basketball player
 John R. MacDougall, broadcast hijacker best known for the Captain Midnight broadcast signal intrusion
 Buddy MacKay, former governor of Florida
 Travis Mays, NBA basketball player
 Jeremy McKinnon, musician
 Chris Meffert, politician
 James Melton, opera singer
 Eugene Milton, NFL football player
 Maxey Dell Moody, businessman
 Slomon Moody, physician and farmer
 Steve Morse, composer/guitarist
 Reid Nichols, Major League Baseball player
 Martha O'Driscoll, actress
 Patrick O'Neal, actor
 Ted Potter Jr., professional golfer
 Kelly Preston, actress
 Jason Schappert, flight instructor
 Elisa Rae Shupe, US Army sergeant, first in the US to obtain legal recognition of a non-binary gender
 Lamar Thomas, NFL player and commentator
 Mava Lee Thomas, All-American Girls Professional Baseball League player
 John Travolta, actor
 Jim Williams, former lieutenant governor of Florida
 P. J. Williams, NFL cornerback for the New Orleans Saints
 Walter Ray Williams Jr., professional PBA bowler
 Tyrone Young, NFL wide receiver

Notable musical groups

 A Day to Remember, pop-punk/metalcore band
 The Royal Guardsmen, band originating in the 1960s
 Seventh Star, Christian metalcore band
 Wage War, metalcore band

 Underoath, metalcore band

See also
 Appleton Museum of Art
 Emergency Medical Services Alliance
 Jumbolair Airport
 List of sites and peoples visited by the Hernando de Soto Expedition
 Ocala National Forest
 Sholom Park
 Star–Banner
 United Hebrews of Ocala

References

External links

 City of Ocala, Florida
 Historic Ocala Preservation Society
 Ocala Banner, the East Florida Banner, and the Southern Sun, historical newspapers serving Ocala, Florida, full text and images openly online in the Florida Digital Newspaper Library
 Ocala/Marion Chamber of Commerce

 
Cities in Florida
Cities in Marion County, Florida
County seats in Florida
Populated places established in 1836
1836 establishments in Florida Territory